Fayetteville National Cemetery is a United States National Cemetery located on the southern side of the city of Fayetteville in Washington County, Arkansas. As of 2020, over 11,000 veterans and family members were interred in this location, with approximately 200 new burials per year.

History 
The original layout was of an outer circle surrounding a six-pointed star with diamonds between the points of the star and a flagpole in the center. There were eighteen sections with an estimated capacity of 1,800 graves. The first interments were remains moved from battlefield cemeteries of the Battle of Prairie Grove and the Battle of Pea Ridge. By 1871 there were 1,200 interments made in the cemetery, most of which were unidentified.

During World War II the cemetery was enlarged, the layout was revised, and five more sections were added.

In 1989, the Regional National Cemetery Improvement Corporation (RNCIC – a group of locals, veterans, and other concerned benefactors) raised enough money to purchase an additional  of land, and donated it to the cemetery. The group continued their efforts over the years and donated numerous plots of land.  In their latest and largest donation they donated 2.3 acres in ceremonies at the National Cemetery on November 9, 2013.

Fayetteville National Cemetery was placed on the National Register of Historic Places on July 28, 1999.

Notable monuments 
 The Revolutionary War Soldier Memorial, erected in the early 1990s.
 The Purple Heart Memorial, erected in 2000 to honor Purple Heart recipients.

Notable interments 
 Clarence B. Craft (1921–2002), Medal of Honor recipient for action at Hen Hill, Okinawa in 1945
 Vance Randolph (1892–1980), noted Ozarks folklorist and author

See also
 National Register of Historic Places listings in Washington County, Arkansas
 List of cemeteries in Arkansas

References

External links
 National Cemetery Administration
 Fayetteville National Cemetery
  Fayetteville National Cemetery at Encyclopedia of Arkansas
 Fayetteville National Cemetery List of Burials
 Regional National Cemetery Improvement Corp.
 
 
 
 

Cemeteries on the National Register of Historic Places in Arkansas
United States national cemeteries
Protected areas of Washington County, Arkansas
Historic American Buildings Survey in Arkansas
Historic American Landscapes Survey in Arkansas
Tourist attractions in Fayetteville, Arkansas
National Register of Historic Places in Fayetteville, Arkansas
1867 establishments in Arkansas
Cemeteries established in the 1860s